Narmada Expressway is a proposed eight-lane expressway in the state of Madhya Pradesh. The proposed expressway will connect the historic towns of Amarkantak in the eastern end of Madhya Pradesh via Dindori, Shahpura, Jabalpur, Narmadapuram, Barwaha and Alirajpur in the western end of Madhya Pradesh alongside the Narmada River. The expressway measures 1,300 km. It will connect Gujarat with Chhattisgarh. Later, this road will be extended to connect Alirajpur to Ahmedabad.

Connecting cities 

Amarkantak
Dindori
Shahpura
Mandla
Jabalpur
Narsinghpur
Khirkiya
Narmadapuram
Harda
Khirkiya
Harsud
Khandwa
Mundi
Omkareshwar
Barwaha
Kukshi
Alirajpur

Narmada Expressway connects 13 districts in Madhya Pradesh.

Status updates
 May 2020: Narmada expressway project to be revived.
 Jun 2021: Madhya Pradesh chief minister asks officials to expedite land acquisition of the expressway.
 Feb 2022: Madhya Pradesh's cabinet has approved the 906 kms long Narmada Expressway project.

References

Proposed expressways in India
Roads in Madhya Pradesh